Cecil Landau Heftel (September 30, 1924 – February 4, 2010), popularly known as Cec Heftel, was an American politician and businessman from Hawai'i.  He served in the United States House of Representatives from 1977 to 1986 for the First Congressional District, encompassing most of urban Honolulu.

Early years
Heftel was born in Chicago, Illinois; his maternal grandparents were from Russia and his paternal grandparents from Poland. He attended Roosevelt High School in Albany Park, Chicago, then obtained his bachelor's degree from the Arizona State University in 1951. Heftel then attended the University of Utah and New York University for graduate work. Heftel was a Latter-day Saint.

Heftel settled in Honolulu and established Heftel Broadcasting. He owned KGMB-AM-FM-TV and several other television and radio stations across the country. From 1943 to 1946, Heftel served in the United States Army.

In 1957 Heftel was a pioneer for what was then called Top 30 programming, when he purchased KIMN in Denver. In one of the nation's most competitive radio markets, KIMN became the dominant  #1 rated radio station. Heftel sold the station in 1960, returning to Hawaii, but once again in 1973 re-entered the mainland with the purchase of WHYI-FM, Ft. Lauderdale, Florida, identifying the station as Y-100. In 1974, Heftel hired consultant John Rook, who secured the services of Jackson, Mississippi programmer Bill Tanner, who crafted a Top 40 format described by Tanner as being "predictable unpredictability" that propelled the station to the top of the south Florida ratings, where it stayed for several years. The station was later sold by Heftel. Heftel also purchased WJAS-AM in Pittsburgh which he later sold.

Heftel had a knack for getting in and out of station ownership in the 1970s, 1980's, and 1990's. As broadcast revenues are tied to audience interest (ratings) and to advertising cycles, it can be a great business or a poor one. Heftel's mostly AM group of Top-40 stations was sold in the late 1970s. The next group of stations Heftel purchased consisted of FM stations which were coming into their own in the early seventies. These were sold off in the 1980s and included WZPL (move into Indianapolis) and WLLT (Cincinnati).

Heftel partnered with Scott Ginsburg for a time in 1986–1987 as H & G Communications. This group included WLUP AM/FM Chicago, stations in Miami, and other cities.

The last Heftel Broadcasting accumulation of stations consisted of New York, Los Angeles, Chicago, Dallas, Las Vegas, and Miami. These were taken over by Clear Channel Communications in a 1996 tender offer. This in turn was merged with Mac Tichenor's Tichenor Media System into a new Heftel Broadcasting. That changed its name to Hispanic Broadcasting Corp (now Univision Radio).

Political career
Upon returning to his business in Honolulu, Heftel decided to run for political office.

In 1970, Heftel was the Democratic nominee for U.S. Senate, but lost narrowly to incumbent Republican Hiram Fong. He became a delegate to the 1972 Hawai'i State Democratic Convention.  There, he was elected in caucus to become a delegate to the Democratic National Convention.

In 1976, Heftel was elected to Congress from the First District and was reelected four more times.  While in office, Heftel was part of the U.S. fact-finding mission to the Philippines, largely responsible for the forced ouster of dictator Ferdinand Marcos.

Heftel resigned on July 19, 1986, to run for governor, but lost the Democratic primary to John Waihee.  Heftel blamed the loss on a smear campaign against him.  Democrats have long asserted that the smear came from Republicans looking to run against Democrat John Waihee as an easier path to governor.  Many in Hawaii political circles, however, believe the smear was orchestrated by a more powerful political machine that was afraid of Heftel's no-nonsense, honest approach.

Post congressional career
In 1992, he was a supporter of the presidential campaign of Ross Perot.

In 1998, he briefly returned to the political realm, authoring a book, End Legalized Bribery, in which he attempted to prove that the current state of campaign finance corrupts politicians, prevents qualified individuals from running for office, and costs citizens billions of dollars in pork barrel spending and corporate welfare. The book also contained arguments in favor of a national Clean Elections law and mandatory free commercial airtime for political candidates.

After 18 years out of the spotlight, the 80-year-old Heftel made a successful return to elective politics by being elected in November 2004 to the state Board of Education for the Oahu-At Large seat.

Death and legacy
Cecil Heftel died on February 4, 2010, from natural causes in San Diego, California. He was 85. (Numerous websites claim he died February 5, but his widow says he died on February 4.)
On June 13, 2011, U.S. Rep. Colleen Hanabusa introduced legislation to designate the post office at 4354 Pahoa Avenue in Honolulu as the "Cecil L. Heftel Post Office Building".

References

External links

Cecil Heftel-a tribute by former employee John Rook
Some background on Cecil Heftel by John Rook
 

|-

1924 births
2010 deaths
20th-century American businesspeople
20th-century American politicians
American radio executives
American television executives
Arizona State University alumni
Businesspeople from Hawaii
Democratic Party members of the United States House of Representatives from Hawaii
Latter Day Saints from Arizona
Latter Day Saints from Hawaii
Latter Day Saints from Illinois
Members of the Hawaii Board of Education
Military personnel from Illinois
Politicians from Chicago
Politicians from Honolulu
United States Army soldiers
University of Utah alumni